Zoghman Mebkhout (born 1949 ) (مبخوت زغمان) is a French-Algerian mathematician. He is known for his work in algebraic analysis, geometry and representation theory, more precisely on the theory of D-modules.

Career 
Mebkhout is currently a research director at the French National Centre for Scientific Research and in 2002 Zoghman received the Servant Medal from the CNRS a prize given every two years with an amount of €10,000.

Notable works
In September 1979 Mebkhout presented the Riemann–Hilbert correspondence, which is a generalization of Hilbert's twenty-first problem to higher dimensions. The original setting was for Riemann surfaces, where it was about the existence of regular differential equations with prescribed monodromy groups.

In higher dimensions, Riemann surfaces are replaced by complex manifolds of dimension > 1. Certain systems of partial differential equations (linear and having very special properties for their solutions) and possible monodromies of their solutions correspond. An independent proof of this result was presented by Masaki Kashiwara in April 1980.

Zoghman is now largely known as a specialist in D-modules theory.

Recognition 
Zoghman is one of the first modern international-caliber North-African mathematicians. A symposium in Spain was held on his sixtieth birthday. He was invited to the Institute for Advanced Study and gave a recent talk at Institut Fourier.

Alexander Grothendieck said that Mebkhout's name was hidden and his role neglected in an operation headed by Pierre Deligne in the Luminy congress in June 1981. He calls it "a great disgrace of the mathematical world of this century" and is one of the reasons of Grothendieck's departure from mathematics.

References 

Differential equations
Representation theory
1949 births
Algerian mathematicians
Living people
People from Naâma Province
21st-century Algerian people